Bhattian may refer to:

Bhattian is a village in the Phillaur tehsil of Jalandhar District of the Indian state of Punjab.
Pindi Bhattian is a city in the state of Punjab, Pakistan.
Jalalpur Bhattian is a city in the Hafizabad District of Pakistan.
Bhattian (Ludhiana West) is a village located in the Ludhiana West tehsil, of Ludhiana district, Punjab.